Stevie Baggs (born December 30, 1981) is an American former professional football player, actor, motivational speaker, and author. He has written two books,  Greater Than The Game and Woke.

Football career
Baggs played college football at Bethune-Cookman University, where he was a three-time All-American and Mel Blount SBN Defensive Player of the Year not to mention the winner of the Ernie Davis award. Baggs has played for the Winnipeg Blue Bombers, Edmonton Eskimos, Saskatchewan Roughriders, and Hamilton Tiger-Cats. He was signed by the Detroit Lions as an undrafted free agent in 2004. He was a member of the Jacksonville Jaguars practice squad in 2005. In 2006, Baggs signed with the Winnipeg Blue Bombers. He signed and played for the Edmonton Eskimos during the 2007 season. Baggs signed with the Saskatchewan Roughriders as a free agent in September 2008. Additionally, Baggs had stints with the Arizona Cardinals, Hamilton Tiger-Cats, Baltimore Ravens, and the Calgary Stampeders.

Acting career
Baggs was featured in Season 2 of the reality/dating television series Match Made in Heaven. He has also appeared in television shows such as Love & Hip Hop: Atlanta, Necessary Roughness, and Star. Currently, Baggs has starring roles in Tyler Perry's drama/thriller Ruthless on BET+ and the Netflix series Cobra Kai.

References

External links
 
 

1981 births
Living people
American football defensive ends
American football linebackers
American players of Canadian football
Arizona Cardinals players
Baltimore Ravens players
Bethune–Cookman Wildcats football players
Calgary Stampeders players
Canadian football defensive linemen
Detroit Lions players
Edmonton Elks players
Frankfurt Galaxy players
Hamilton Tiger-Cats players
Jacksonville Jaguars players
Orlando Predators players
Players of American football from Fort Lauderdale, Florida
Players of Canadian football from Fort Lauderdale, Florida
Saskatchewan Roughriders players
Winnipeg Blue Bombers players
Players of Canadian football from Florida